Fane Airport is an airfield serving Fane, in the Central Province of Papua New Guinea.

References

External links
 

Airports in Papua New Guinea
Central Province (Papua New Guinea)